Biography Index is a bibliographic index that indexes biographical information contained in books and magazines.  Its content can also be found in the bibliographic databases Biography Index: Past and Present  and Biography Index Retrospective.

Resources

Publications established in 1946
Bibliographic databases and indexes